The Dominican Summer Yankees are a minor league baseball team in the Dominican Summer League. The team plays in the Boca Chica South division and is affiliated with the New York Yankees.

Roster

External links
DSL Yankees 1 at Baseball Reference

Dominican Summer League teams
New York Yankees minor league affiliates
Baseball teams in the Dominican Republic